Derek Watson (born May 1, 1981 in Pelzer, South Carolina) is a former professional Canadian football running back for the Calgary Stampeders of the Canadian Football League. He was signed by the New England Patriots as an undrafted free agent in 2003. He played college football for the South Carolina State Bulldogs and the South Carolina Gamecocks.  He attended high school at Palmetto High School in Williamston, South Carolina.

Watson has also played for the Tampa Bay Buccaneers.

External links
Calgary Stampeders bio

1981 births
Living people
American football running backs
American players of Canadian football
Calgary Stampeders players
Canadian football running backs
New England Patriots players
People from Anderson, South Carolina
South Carolina State Bulldogs football players
Tampa Bay Buccaneers players
South Carolina Gamecocks football players
People from Pelzer, South Carolina